Rha (Ԗ ԗ; italics: Ԗ ԗ) is a letter of the Cyrillic script. It looks like a cross-digraph of the Cyrillic letters Er (Р р) and Kha (Х х), but it is not a composable ligature.

Rha was used in the alphabet used in the 1920s for the Moksha language, where it represented the voiceless alveolar trill .

See also
Р̌ р̌ : Cyrillic letter Er with caron
Ҏ ҏ : Cyrillic letter Er with tick
Cyrillic characters in Unicode

References

Cyrillic letters